Vasily Grishchenkov born 23 January 1958) is a retired triple jumper from the Soviet Union, best known for winning the silver medal at the 1982 European Championships in Athens, Greece. He set the world's best year performance in 1983 with a leap of 17.55 metres (personal best), achieved on 19 June 1983 in Moscow.

References
 

1958 births
Living people
Soviet male triple jumpers
Russian male triple jumpers
Place of birth missing (living people)
European Athletics Championships medalists